Boorara is a small town in the Goldfields region of Western Australia.

The origin of the town's name is Aboriginal but the meaning of the word is unknown.

The townsite was gazetted in 1897.

References

Suburbs of Kalgoorlie-Boulder
Populated places established in 1897